Thüringische Muschwitz (also: Moschwitz) is a river on the border of Bavaria and Thuringia, Germany. It flows into the Selbitz near Lichtenberg.

On the side of Thuringia, in Saale-Orla-Kreis (municipalities of Schlegel, Harra, and Blankenstein), a nature protected area, Thüringische Muschwitz mit Grenzstreifen, has been opened.

See also
List of rivers of Bavaria
List of rivers of Thuringia

References

Rivers of Bavaria
Rivers of Thuringia
Nature reserves in Bavaria
Nature reserves in Thuringia
Rivers of Germany